Battery Thomson is a historic artillery battery located at Sullivan's Island, Charleston County, South Carolina. It was built in 1906–1909, and is one of a series of batteries stretching from Fort Moultrie to the eastern end of Sullivan's Island. Until decommissioned in 1947, the concrete battery housed two, ten inch guns. It measures approximately 326 feet long and 84 feet wide, with the front or ocean side of the battery at approximately 10 feet high.  Battery Thomson and its neighbor Battery Gadsden provided fortification at the mouth of Charleston Harbor.

It was listed on the National Register of Historic Places in 1974.

References

Military facilities on the National Register of Historic Places in South Carolina
Buildings and structures completed in 1909
Buildings and structures in Charleston County, South Carolina
National Register of Historic Places in Charleston County, South Carolina